The governor-general of Malta was the official representative of  Elizabeth II, Queen of Malta, in the State of Malta from 1964 to 1974. This office replaced that of the governor, and it was replaced by that of president upon the proclamation of the Republic of Malta on 13 December 1974.

List of governors-general (1964–1974)
The governor-general of Malta was the representative of the monarch in Malta and exercised most of the powers of the monarch. The governor-general was appointed for an indefinite term, serving at the pleasure of the monarch. After the passage of the Statute of Westminster 1931, the governor-general was appointed solely on the advice of the Cabinet of Malta without the involvement of the British government. In the event of a vacancy, the chief justice served as the officer administering the government.

 Status

See also

List of governors of Malta
List of presidents of Malta
List of prime ministers of Malta
Lists of incumbents

1964 establishments in Malta
1974 disestablishments in Malta
Malta, Governors-General
 
Governor-General
 
Malta and the Commonwealth of Nations